Rollo Brandt (25 November 1934 – 24 May 1964) was a British bobsledder. He was educated at Oundle School and St John's College, Cambridge, where he led the college's rugby union team to several wins over other Cambridge colleges.

He competed in the four-man event at the 1956 Winter Olympics, as part of the British crew that finished 12th.

References

1934 births
1964 deaths
British male bobsledders
Olympic bobsledders of Great Britain
Bobsledders at the 1956 Winter Olympics
Sportspeople from St Albans
Alumni of St John's College, Cambridge
People educated at Oundle School